Ethel F. Wilson Memorial Provincial Park is a provincial park in central British Columbia, Canada. The park is situated on the northern tip of Pinkut Lake. Activities in the park include rainbow trout fishing and boating. The park has five campsites that are allocated on a first-come first-served basis. The area of the park is 33 hectares.

References

 

Provincial parks of British Columbia
Regional District of Bulkley-Nechako
Year of establishment missing